Heindrich Swanepol is a Paralympic athlete from Great Britain competing mainly in category F12 javelin events.

Heindrich won a bronze medal in the F12 javelin at the 2000 Summer Paralympics in Sydney.

References

Paralympic athletes of Great Britain
Athletes (track and field) at the 2000 Summer Paralympics
Paralympic bronze medalists for Great Britain
Living people
Medalists at the 2000 Summer Paralympics
Year of birth missing (living people)
Paralympic medalists in athletics (track and field)
British male javelin throwers
Visually impaired javelin throwers
Paralympic javelin throwers